Tessenow is a village and a former municipality in the Ludwigslust-Parchim district, in Mecklenburg-Vorpommern, Germany. Since January 2019, it is part of the new municipality Ruhner Berge.

References

Ludwigslust-Parchim
Former municipalities in Mecklenburg-Western Pomerania